Tore Sagvolden (born 27 February 1959) is a Norwegian orienteering competitor. He is four times Relay World Champion, in 1981, 1983, 1985 and 1987. He obtained silver in the Individual World Orienteering Championships 1981, 1985 and 1987, and bronze in 1979.

References

1959 births
Living people
Norwegian orienteers
Male orienteers
Foot orienteers
World Orienteering Championships medalists
20th-century Norwegian people
21st-century Norwegian people